Lippok is a surname. Notable people with the surname include:

 Robert Lippok (born 1966), German musician, composer, visual artist, and stage and costume designer
 Silke Lippok (born 1994), German swimmer

German-language surnames